George Arias (born 21 April 1974) is a Brazilian former professional boxer. He challenged once for the WBO cruiserweight title in 2001.

Professional career
Arias faced boxers such as Kubrat Pulev, Hughie Fury, Taras Bidenko, Owen Beck, Sinan Şamil Sam and Juan Carlos Gomez. All but Gomez failed to stop Arias.

He started his career at cruiserweight, having a short against WBO cruiserweight champion Johnny Nelson in January 2001 losing by a lopsided unanimous decision.

He fought on the undercard of an IBF title match between Chris Byrd vs Evander Holyfield on December 14, 2002 against former NABF champion Fres Oquendo, losing by 11th round TKO.

On 6 September 2008, Arias faced former Olympic Gold medalist Audley Harrison at the MEN Arena in Manchester, live on Sky Box Office, on the undercard of Amir Khan vs. Breidis Prescott. but lost on points 94 to 98. He only had a 4-day notice to the bout after Martin Rogan had pulled out with injury.

Arias is a former Brazilian and South American heavyweight title holder. As of 2009 he was preparing himself to make an assault toward the world title but this time with the professional help of investors, however this never came to pass and he never received a shot at a world heavyweight title. He works as a personal trainer.

He retired after a 2nd round TKO defeat at the hand of Zhang Junlong.

Professional boxing record

References

External links
 

1974 births
Living people
Heavyweight boxers
Sportspeople from São Paulo
Brazilian male boxers
Brazilian people of Spanish descent
Brazilian people of Portuguese descent